Ernest "Ernie" Woodhead (2 February 1857 – 10 June 1944) was an English rugby union footballer who played in the 1880s. He played at representative level for England, and at club level for Huddersfield, as a forward, e.g. front row, lock, or back row. Prior to Tuesday 27 August 1895, Huddersfield was a rugby union club.

Background
Ernie Woodhead was born in Huddersfield, West Riding of Yorkshire, he was the son of Joseph Woodhead, Liberal Party Member of parliament for Spen Valley, he died aged 87 in Huddersfield, West Riding of Yorkshire.

Playing career

International honours
Ernie Woodhead won a cap for England while at Huddersfield in 1880 against Ireland.

Change of Code
When Huddersfield converted from the rugby union code to the rugby league code on Tuesday 27 August 1895, Ernie Woodhead would have been 38. Consequently, he may have been too old to have been both a rugby union and rugby league footballer for Huddersfield.

Political career
He was active for the Liberal Party in Huddesfield local politics for many years, being a member of Huddesfield Borough Council, including serving as Mayor of Huddesfield. 
For the 1918 General Election he stood as Liberal Party candidate for Huddersfield, however, another Liberal candidate also stood but with the support of the Coalition Government. As a result, he finished third. For the 1923 General Election, he was Liberal Party candidate for Sheffield Hillsborough and finished third. For the 1924 General Election he was Liberal Party candidate for Pudsey & Otley and again finished third. He did not stand for parliament again.

References

External links
Search for "Woodhead" at rugbyleagueproject.org

1857 births
1944 deaths
England international rugby union players
English rugby union players
Huddersfield Giants players
Rugby union players from Huddersfield
Rugby union forwards
Liberal Party (UK) parliamentary candidates
British sportsperson-politicians